Admiralty Park is a national park in Singapore that is 27 hectares in size It is made unique by its river valley shaped hilly terrain.

Background
This feature reflects the history of the site, as it used to have Sungei Cina running through it. Visitors can use the main circulation path constructed alongside the valley.

The park has a nature area spanning 20 hectares in size, the biggest nature area within a park in Singapore. Much of the park is mangrove swamp. Three boardwalks cut through the mangrove, providing places for observing and appreciating the flora and fauna with minimal disturbance of the habitat. The park works closely with neighbouring Republic Polytechnic, which is also the adopter of the park under the adopt-a-park scheme. One collaboration with them has been the Admiralty Park E-Guide, an online guide to the plants in the park produced by students from the School of Applied Science.

Admiralty Park is also used for sports recreation purposes and to facilitate this there are fitness stations and a running track.  Concerts and performances and hiking and nature walks also take place.  Wi-Fi hotspots for visitors are provided at locations around the park.

Getting there
The park is a 15-minute walk from Woodlands MRT station.

See also
List of Parks in Singapore

References

Parks in Singapore
Woodlands, Singapore